The Tenmile Creek Dolomite is a geologic formation in Ohio. It preserves fossils dating back to the Devonian period.

References
 Generalized Stratigraphic Chart for Ohio

Devonian Ohio